The Charlie Parker Omnibook is a collection of transcriptions of compositions and improvised solos by jazz saxophonist Charlie Parker. It is available for E-flat, B-flat, C and bass-clef instruments. It includes 60 pieces, transcribed by Ken Slone with proofreading assistance from Jamey Aebersold, information about the records, and practice suggestions. The Charlie Parker Omnibook is published by Hal Leonard LLC.

Charlie Parker (1920–1955) was one of the pioneers of the Bebop style of jazz. This idiom is characterized by fast tempos, instrumental virtuosity, and improvisation over set harmonic structures. Parker’s style of playing and his harmonic treatment particularly in improvisation continues to be influential across multiple genres and instruments. In particular, he innovated rapid passing chords, new variants of altered chords, and chord substitutions. His realization that the 12 notes of the chromatic scale can lead melodically to any key led to him escaping from the confines of previously practiced improvisation methods.

The Omnibook has become a major reference for students of jazz improvisation in many genres of jazz music not just bebop. Portions of Parker’s improvised solos continue to be quoted by other improvising jazz musicians today. The transcriptions are not intended to be studied by saxophonists new to the instrument but rather by advanced students with some prior jazz idiom knowledge and considerable instrumental skill. Very few articulation marks are notated.

Transcriptions included in the book
 Ah-Leu-Cha
 Another Hairdo
 Anthropology (composition)
 Au Privave
 Au Privave (No. 2)
 Back Home Blues
 Ballade (Parker C)
 Barbados
 Billie's Bounce (Bill's Bounce)
 The Bird
 Bird Gets the Worm (Parker)
 Bloomdido
 Blue Bird
 Blues (Fast)
 Blues for Alice
 Buzzy
 Card Board
 Celerity (Parker)
 Chasing The Bird
 Cheryl
 Chi Chi
 Confirmation
 Constellation
 Cosmic Rays
 Dewey Square
 Diverse (Parker)
 Donna Lee
 K.C. Blues
 Kim
 Kim (No. 2)
 Klaunstance
 Ko-Ko
 Laird Baird
 Leap Frog (Parker C)
 Marmaduke
 Merry Go Round (Parker C)
 Mohawk
 Mohawk (No. 2)
 Moose the Mooche
 My Little Suede Shoes
 Now's The Time
 Now's The Time (No. 2)
 Ornithology
 An Oscar For Treadwell
 Parker's Mood
 Passport
 Perhaps
 Red Cross
 Relaxing With Lee (Parker)
 Scrapple from the Apple
 Segment
 Shawnuff
 She Rote
 She Rote (No. 2)
 Si Si
 Steeplechase
 Thriving From A Riff
 Visa
 Warming Up A Riff (Parker)
 Yardbird Suite

References

External links
  Google Books

Charlie Parker
Jazz books
Jazz publications
Musical improvisation